Albin Oscar (Swede) Carlstrom (October 26, 1886 – April 28, 1935) was a Major League Baseball shortstop. Carlstrom batted and threw right-handed. He was born in Elizabeth, New Jersey.

An American of Swedish heritage, Carlstrom was a combat veteran of World War I whose health was damaged during the armed conflict. He saw action in minor leagues with the Lawrence club of the New England League before joining the Boston Red Sox in the 1911 season. He appeared with Boston in two games on September 13–14 and posted a .167 batting average (1-for-6) without home runs or RBI. As a fielder, he recorded three put-outs with six assists and turned into a double play for a perfect 1.000 fielding percentage.

Carlstrom served with Company G, 346th Infantry, 27th Division in France, where he contracted rheumatism, which ended his baseball career. He died of a cerebral spinal fever in his hometown of Elizabeth, New Jersey, at the age of 48.

External links
Baseball Reference
The Deadball Era
Retroseet

Boston Red Sox players
Major League Baseball shortstops
American military personnel of World War I
American people of Swedish descent
Baseball players from New Jersey
1886 births
1935 deaths
Lawrence Colts players
Lawrence Barristers players
Montreal Royals players
Buffalo Bisons (minor league) players
Jersey City Skeeters players
Syracuse Stars (minor league baseball) players
Cumberland Colts players
Sportspeople from Elizabeth, New Jersey